Santa Cruz Province is a province in the Cajamarca Region of Peru, with its capital at Santa Cruz de Succhabamba. The province has an area of 1,417.93 km² and the government population estimate for 2002 is 49,302, with the 1993 census showing a population of 44,571. Agriculture is the predominant economic activity.

Geography
Santa Cruz Province's land area is 1,423 km², 4.2% of the total of the Cajamarca Region. It is mostly mountainous in relief. It is located on the  Western Mountain range of the Andes and is bounded by the mountains that descend to the coast and the deep rivers that carve the mountains. Its lowest elevation is in the Saña River, near the small village of Pan de Azucar, 265 meters above sea level, and highest in the Cerro Cimarrones, 3,600 meters above sea level, south of the town of Pulán.

It is bounded to the North by Chota, to the East by Hualgayoc and Chota, to the South by San Miguel, and to the West by Lambayeque.

The climate is varied with an average temperature of 22 °C. in the Chala area and 17 °C. in the Yunga area.

Political division 
The province is divided into eleven districts:

Places of interest
 Bosques Nublados de Udima Wildlife Refuge 
 Chancaybaños Reserved Zone

See also 
 Q'inququcha
 Yawarqucha

References 
  Instituto Nacional de Estadística e Informática. Banco de Información Digital. Retrieved November 4, 2007

External links 
 
 

Provinces of the Cajamarca Region